Grant McDonald may refer to:
 Grant McDonald (baseball)
 Grant McDonald (Canadian football)

See also
 Grant Macdonald, a silversmith and goldsmith company
 Grant MacDonald, outsider musician